Cyrtodactylus aequalis is a bent-toed gecko species that was discovered in 2001 in Myanmar's Kyaikhtiyo Wildlife Sanctuary and described in 2003.

References

External links 

Cyrtodactylus
Reptiles described in 2003